Les Bollman (15 July 1904 – 28 June 1955) was an  Australian rules footballer who played with South Melbourne in the Victorian Football League (VFL).

Notes

External links 

1904 births
1955 deaths
Australian rules footballers from Victoria (Australia)
Sydney Swans players
Yarraville Football Club players